The Euthydemid dynasty was a Hellenistic dynasty founded by Euthydemus I in 230 BC which ruled the Greco-Bactrian and Indo-Greek kingdoms throughout the Hellenistic period from 230 BC to 10 AD, upon the death of its last ruler, Strato III in Gandhara.

History
It is possible that Euthydemus was a son of a certain Antimachus (born 295 BC) and a grandson of Sophytes, a satrap or ruler of Bactria in around 300 BC.

Euthydemus was a satrap of Sogdiana that was married to a sister of Diodotus II, son of the original rebel, Diodotus I. He usurped the throne from Diodotus II or perhaps Antiochus Nikator and became ruler of the  Greco-Bactrian Kingdom. Later on in his reign, he faced an invasion by the younger and ambitious Antiochus III the Great. He was defeated on the Arius but successively waited out Antiochus in his capital Bactra. His peace treaty with Antiochus granted his son Demetrius I a marriage to an unnamed daughter of Antiochus.

His son Demetrius I would go on to invade northern India and establish the Indo-Greek kingdom. After Demetrius's sons Agathocles, Euthydemus II and perhaps even Demetrius II rule over the Greco-Bactrian and Indo-Greek kingdoms, it becomes harder to pinpoint which of the following rulers were related to each other, or even if they were members of the Euthydemid dynasty. It is possible however, that the powerful king Menander I was a member of this dynasty.

Rulers
Precise members of this royal family cannot be fully reconstructed due to the lack of evidence and only a remaining vast coinage of following rulers. Demetrius's successor, Agathocles, left behind extensive coinage that helped reconstruct part of the dynasty. Some of the more certain rulers are: 

 Sophytes (330-300 BC) satrap of the Paropamisadae,  welcomed Alexander the Great and the grandfather of Euthydemus I  

 Euthydemus I (260-195 BC) eponymous founder of the dynasty
 Demetrius I (222-180 BC) most famous of the Euthydemids - invaded India
 Euthydemus II ( c. 200-185 BC) Son of Euthydemus I
 Pantaleon (190-180 BC) Son of Euthydemus I
 Demetrius II (fl. 175-140 BC)
 Antimachus I (c.171-160 BC) Son of Euthydemus I
 Antimachus II (c. 170-165 BC)
 Menander I (c. 165/155-130 BC) married Agathoclia, father of Strato I
Agathoclia I (c. 130-125 BC) widow of Menander, ruled as regent for son, Strato I
 Strato I (c. 125-105 BC) son of Menander I and Agathoclia I
Demetrius III (c. 105-100 BC)
Amyntas I (c. 100-90 BC)
Menander II (c. 105 BC)
Demetrius IV (c. 80 BC)
Strato II (c.30 BC)
Strato III (c.10 AD) last ruler
Demetrius V (c. 10 AD) ? potential claimant ruler 

Following these rulers, it becomes increasingly hard to date or connect them to any family, as they may have been usurpers, but the Euthydemids remained the most constant and long reigning dynasty of Greek Bactria and India.

See also
Eucratides I
Seleucid Empire

References 

 
Indo-Greek kings
Greco-Bactrian kings
Hellenistic dynasties